Galabin Boevski (born 19 December 1974) is a Bulgarian weightlifter. He was born in Knezha, and was both World Champion and Olympic Champion. He was later suspended for eight years after failing drug tests.

Boevski was sentenced to nine years and four months in prison in Brazil for cocaine trafficking. He was arrested in October 2011 while trying to board a plane in São Paulo, Brazil, to Europe with 9 kilos of cocaine. In October 2012, the appellate court of Brazil decided against reducing his sentence.
On 23 October 2013, he returned to Bulgaria. Asked how, he did not comment. The Bulgarian government stated that the release was a unilateral act by Brazil and they do not know of any details.

Weightlifting career
Boevski became World Champion in the lightweight class in 1999, and was also European champion this year. At the 2000 Summer Olympics he won the gold medal in the lightweight class.

He became world champion for the second time in 2001, and European champion in 2002 and in 2003.

Boevski set six Senior World Records in the 69 kg class during his career. His Total world record of 357.5 kg (set at the 1999 World Championships) not being broken until 2013 by a total of 358 kg by Liao Hui.

Suspension for failing drug test
In 2004, Galabin Boevski was suspended for eight years for failing a second drug test.

Major Results

Drug trafficking conviction 
Boevski was arrested in October 2011, for possession of 9 kg of cocaine at the Guarulhos Airport in São Paulo, Brazil, on his way back from a tennis tournament for his daughter, Sara. He was, allegedly recruited as a mule to smuggle illegal drugs from Brazil to Western Europe. The drug was found hidden in special secret compartments inside his suitcase.

In May 2012, Boevski was sentenced to 9 years and 4 months in prison by the Federal Court in Brazil. Until the end of his trial, Boevski maintained his position that he is absolutely innocent and is not a mule or a drug trafficker. He supposed that he might have picked up the wrong suitcases intended for someone else. A little over a year later, in October 2013, Boevski surprisingly landed at Sofia's airport as a free man.  The Bulgarian authorities had not been informed of his release and had no comment.  Subsequently, it was made clear that Boevski was expulsed from prison following a usual Brazilian procedure for expulsion of foreign prisoners.

The Bulgarian authorities were criticized for the lack of coordination and communication with their Brazilian counterparts - mainly for not indicting Boevski in Bulgaria and for not knowing of his Brazilian expulsion.

The White Prisoner 
On December 21, 2013, Trud published a biography on Boevski's life entitled The White Prisoner: Galabin Boevski's Secret Story (Bulgarian: Белият затворник. Тайната история на Гълъбин Боевски). The book was written by Ognian Georgiev, a sports editor for the daily newspaper Bulgaria Today. The book spans Boevski's entire career as well as his cocaine conviction and release. The English version was published on 30 May 2014 as print and e-book.

Honours 

Bulgarian Sportsperson of the Year - 1999

References

External links
 
 
 
 
 

1974 births
Living people
21st-century Bulgarian criminals
Bulgarian male weightlifters
Olympic weightlifters of Bulgaria
Olympic gold medalists for Bulgaria
Olympic medalists in weightlifting
Weightlifters at the 2000 Summer Olympics
Medalists at the 2000 Summer Olympics
World Weightlifting Championships medalists
European Weightlifting Championships medalists
World record setters in weightlifting
Bulgarian sportspeople in doping cases
Doping cases in weightlifting
Bulgarian people imprisoned abroad
People from Knezha